Héctor Echavarría (born December 6, 1969) is an Argentine actor, producer, filmmaker, martial artist, activist, businessman and screenwriter.

Biography

Early life 
Héctor Echavarría was born in Corrientes, the capital city of the northern province of Corrientes, in his native Argentina. Hector was a sickly child who suffered from severe asthma, and was encouraged by his parents to use martial arts to overcome his handicap. He began his training at the age of 4 by studying Tai Chi Chuan and Chinese boxing with a Shaolin Monk, Grand Master Tung Kuo Tsao. By the age of 13, Hector had learned Judo and Jiu Jitsu under Mayamoto of the Kodokan. As a young teenager he was learning Karate, and Tae Kwon Do, and at the time became the youngest kickboxer to enter the ring professionally. From the beginning Hector Echavarria has exceeded all expectations. As a teenager, he was winning fights against much bigger opponents in the mean alleys of Corrientes, Argentina and moved his skills into the ring, where became a legendary martial arts champion. For years he starred in an ultra-popular Latin American television series Brigada, based on the three-film series Los Exterminators, in which he made his acting debut. Even a comic-strip for children was created, following Hector's real-life exploits.

Echavarria, who is an 11 times kick Boxer Champion of the World, was inducted into the United States Martial Arts Hall of Fame in 2000. He was also named the "Full Contact Fighter of the Year" in 2000 and is the former Kickboxing Champion of the World. He has won World Champion status in both the United States Karate Association and the World Kung-Fu Association and remains undefeated Hector defended his belt in eleven world titles kickboxing bouts. He is a Kung-Fu Master and has reached the following levels: 7th dan Karate Shury-ryu, 7th dan Kenpo Karate, 5th dan Tae Kwon Do, 2nd dan Jujitsu, 2nd dan Judo.

When he went to the United States he trained and thrived under the guidance of Grand Master Robert Trias. Eventually, Ed Parker, who was Elvis Presley's bodyguard and the man who put Bruce Lee in movies, discovered Echavarria, who was known for having showmanship in the ring.

Fighting career 
Echavarria began his martial arts training at age 4 and his competitive martial arts career at the age of 17 in his native country of Argentina.

Echavarria was chosen Full Contact Fighter of the Year by the United States Martial Arts Hall of Fame. He also was chosen to represent and be the leader of the International Karate and Kickboxing Association and Joe Corley's Professional Karate Association for all Latin America. Hector has appeared in more than one hundred martial arts and fitness magazine covers, including Blackbelt, which named Hector "The Next Martial Arts Movie Star", Inside Karate, Men's Fitness, and Martial Arts Illustrated.

He has given more than one hundred kickboxing exhibitions around the world, he sparred with kickboxing champion of the world, Bill Wallace. Echavarria has also given numerous demonstrations with celebrities including the Bee Gees, Philip Michael Thomas, and Richard Simmons.

In his status as one of the most respected martial artists in the world, Hector is in constant demand by athletes and celebrities for training, Echavarria has personally trained and helped achieve higher levels of fitness and health to other martial artists, professional sports athletes and celebrities, including Kendra Wilkinson of Playboy Superstars and The Girls Next Door, former three time World boxing champion Macho Camacho, and professional NFL kicker for the New England Patriots, Super Bowl winner Al Del Greco, and mixed martial arts champions such as Quinton Jackson, Cheick Kongo, and many others.

In October 2023 he will play host to the first-ever Hector Echavarria's World Martial Arts Mix Martial Arts Championship and Expo in Buenos aires Argentina to be sanctioned by the TFA (Total Fighting Alliance) Which Hector is the President for the International Division, the event will also be sanctioned by the United States Martial Arts Organization and the International Union of Martial Artist (UIAMA). More than thirty five Countries, three thousand competitors and twenty of the top martial arts merchandising companies in the world will be present as sponsors.

Film career 
After a chance meeting with Miami Vice publicist Carole Myers, Echavarria was asked if he'd want to become an actor. She obtained a television audition for him, and Hector appeared in the 1989 season premiere of Miami Vice: Down for the Count. A few years later, an Argentine producer saw Echavarria in a television demonstration and cast him in the action film Los Extermineitors. This film and its two sequels became the highest grossing winter release movies in South America. Hector played a main character in the Argentine action comedy television series Brigada Cola along with fellow Los Extermineitors cast member and comedian Guillermo Francella, which ran in South America, Europe, and the Middle East from 1992 to 1997.

In April 2009, Echavarria filmed a feature called Death Warrior in Toronto, co-starring Nick Mancuso of Under Siege and Rapid Fire. It was produced by Sean Buckley of Buck Productions and directed by Bill Corcoran and distributed by Grindstone Entertainment Group and Lions Gate Entertainment towards the end of 2009.

Some of the projects he has in production include Justice for All, Kill the Dragon and others with distribution by Lionsgate. In 2010, Hector started production on Unrivaled in Toronto. He is credited as executive producer, writer as well as acting as "Ringo Duran," a "down-on-his-luck cage fighter" along with Rashad Evans and Keith Jardine.

Among many other features, Echavarria produced the horror flick Lake Dead and Farm House starring "[Kelly Hu]", with theatrical distribution through After Dark Films. Later on, Hector produced and starred in Confessions of a Pit Fighter, distributed by Lionsgate. In 2008, he wrote, directed and starred as Diego Carter in the film Never Surrender, also distributed by Lionsgate. In his upcoming "Duel of Legends", Hector, not only co-stars with popular actor Cary-Hiroyuki Tagawa ("Tekken", "Memoirs of a Geisha", "Pearl Harbor", "Mortal Kombat") and with his student and UFC superstar, Quinton Jackson (co-star of the new "The A-Team" movie) but also Hector directed the Feature Film set to be theatrically released in October 2018: Duel of Legends.

He has helped start the film career of some of his friends, including Georges St-Pierre, BJ Penn, Rashad Evans, Anderson Silva and Lyoto Machida. Echavarria is currently working with writer/producer Ronald Shusett, whose sci-fi action and thriller films have reached worldwide grosses of over one and a half billion dollars and who has produced and wrote Total Recall and Minority Report for director Steven Spielberg  in the development and the creation of a franchise project with Hector. In addition to producing and starring in his own films, Hector has become an industrial force- with his own clothing line, martial arts federation, real estate holdings, children's toys and action figures, and an entertainment production company. And now, with his multi-picture slate of action films in which he stars and produces, others are calling him the Tyler Perry of the Hispanic market.
His plan to capture the United States and world markets has been to hone his filmmaking expertise, starting with a multi-picture deal to produce and star in a series of action films distributed on Blue Ray and DVD by Lionsgate. These included Death Warrior, Unrivalled, Confessions of a Pit Fighter, also starring Armand Assante, Flavor Flav and Oscar nominated John Savage, Never Surrender (which he also directed), and the horror film Lake Dead (for After Dark Films).

In 2013 Echavarria directed, wrote and starred in Chavez Cage of Glory with Danny Trejo, James Russo and Steven Bauer, which was produced and released theatrically by Destiny Entertainment Productions. In 2015 Hector filmed No Way Out, that will have him co-star again with Danny Trejo and actress-supermodel Estella Warren. No Way Out was be released in 2018 and distributed by Sony Pictures. Hector is today producing and acting in big budget films and has a planned schedule for the next 10 years, including in-development films like Justice for All, Bloom with Keanu Reeves, Mounds of Clay with Olga Kurylenko, Run of a Hitman starring "Bruce Willis" and American Hostage with director John Moore producer Wyck Godfrey and Jerry Bruckheimer. In 2021 Echavarria raised a $400 million fund for his own Film studio Destiny Media Entertainment, and he aims to develop, produce and self-finance 15 feature films in the next five years.
In 2021 Hector became an executive at the new and successful streaming platform VIVA Live TV that is set to compete against Netflix and Disney Plus. Hector is a partner executive and head of production and programming at VIVA Live TV, a streaming platform with more than 800 live channels from around the world that are advertisement ready. VIVA has an advertising deal with the three biggest advertisement agencies in the US. Viva also has more than 3,500 movies and television shows including The John Wick series, Apocalypse Now, American Hustler and the list goes on and on. Furthermore, Viva Live TV has the ability to feature and produce pay per view events and in 2022 VIVA will produce some of the biggest live events in the US and around the world.

Filmography

Film

Television

References

External links 
 
 
 

1969 births
Living people
People from Corrientes
Male actors from Los Angeles
American male karateka
American jujutsuka
American male kickboxers
Argentine emigrants to the United States
Argentine male actors
Argentine male karateka
Argentine jujutsuka
American Kenpo practitioners
Shuri-ryū practitioners
Argentine male kickboxers
Argentine male taekwondo practitioners
American exercise instructors
Sportspeople from Los Angeles